CPC Bears were a rugby league club based in Carmarthen and are the regional side for Carmarthenshire, Pembrokeshire and Ceredigion. They played in the Welsh Premier Division of the Rugby League Conference.

History
West Wales Sharks were formed in the spring of 2006 and joined the Rugby League Conference. They became the Dinefwr Sharks for the 2009 season. West Wales Wild Boars joined the Conference in 2009.

CPC Bears RL was formed in 2010, as the regional side for Carmarthenshire, Pembrokeshire and Ceredigion in the Welsh Premier Division with Dinefwr Sharks and West Wales Wild Boars competing in the Championship.

CPC Bears failed to complete the 2011 season in the Welsh Premier division.

Juniors
CPC Bears' junior teams take part in the Welsh Conference Junior League and Gillette National Youth League.

External links
 West Wales Rugby League
 Official Wales Rugby League Website

Rugby League Conference teams
Welsh rugby league teams
Rugby clubs established in 2010